Verschuren's swamp rat (Congomys verschureni) is a species of rodent in the family Muridae.
It is found only in Democratic Republic of the Congo.
Its natural habitat is subtropical or tropical moist lowland forests.
It is threatened by habitat loss.

References

Congomys
Rodents of Africa
Mammals described in 1977
Taxonomy articles created by Polbot
Taxobox binomials not recognized by IUCN 
Endemic fauna of the Democratic Republic of the Congo